Dawn is a Pakistani English-language newspaper that was launched in British India in 1941. It is the largest English newspaper in Pakistan, and also serves as the country's newspaper of record. Dawn is the flagship publication of the Dawn Media Group, which also owns local radio station CityFM89 as well as the marketing and media magazine Aurora.

Muhammad Ali Jinnah, Pakistan's founding father, launched the newspaper in Delhi on 26 October 1941, with the goal of establishing it as a mouthpiece for the All-India Muslim League. The first issue was printed at Latifi Press on 12 October 1942. Based in Karachi, it also maintains offices in Lahore and the capital city of Islamabad, in addition to having correspondents abroad. , it has a weekday circulation of over 109,000. The newspaper's current chief editor is Zaffar Abbas.

History

Dawn began as a weekly publication, based in New Delhi. Under the instruction of Jinnah, it became the official organ of the All India Muslim League in Delhi, and the sole voice of the Muslims League in the English language, reflecting and espousing the cause of Pakistan's creation. Jinnah summed up the paper's purpose in these words:

"The Dawn will mirror faithfully the views of Hindustan's Muslims and the All Hindustan Muslim League in all its activities: economic, educational and social and more particularly political, throughout the country fearlessly and independently and while its policy will be, no doubt, mainly to advocate and champion the cause of the Muslims and the policy and programme of the All Hindustan Muslim League, it will not neglect the cause and welfare of the peoples of this sub-continent generally".

Dawn became a daily newspaper in October 1944 under the leadership of its editor, Pothan Joseph, who later resigned in 1944 to take up the position of the government's principal information officer in part because of differences with Jinnah over the Pakistan Movement. He was succeeded by Altaf Husain who galvanized the Muslims of India for independence by his editorials, which earned him the ire of the Congress Party and of Lord Mountbatten, the last Viceroy and Governor-General of the British Raj both of whom wanted a united India.

In 1947, senior Dawn staff led by Altaf Husain moved to Karachi. So, Karachi became the head office of the newspaper.

In 1950, for a brief period, the owners discontinued Dawn over ownership issues and restarted it as Herald.

Features

Dawn regularly carries syndicated articles from western newspapers such as The Independent, The Guardian, the Los Angeles Times and The Washington Post.

On Sundays, the weekend advertiser carries three sections namely "Ad Buzz", "Career", and "Real Estate".

Editors
 Pothan Joseph (1944)
 Altaf Husain (1944–1965)
 Jamil Ansari (1965–1966)
 Yusuf Haroon (1966)
 Jamil Ansari
 Altaf Gauhar
 Mazhar Ali Khan
 Ahmad Ali Khan
 Tahir Mirza
 Saleem Asmi
 Abbas Nasir
 Zaffar Abbas

Controversies

Relations with WikiLeaks
On 19 May 2011, Dawn Media Group signed a memorandum of understanding with Julian Assange, founder of WikiLeaks, for the exclusive first use in Pakistan of all the secret US diplomatic cables related to political and other developments in the country.

An announcement printed in the newspaper and posted on the website read:

Leak controversy 
In 2016, a story, "Act against militants or face international isolation, civilians tell military" by Cyril Almeida, Oxford-educated assistant editor and columnist for Dawn, triggered the resignation of Information Minister Pervaiz Rashid, after a preliminary investigation established a "lapse" on his part vis-à-vis the publication of the "planted" story.

See also

Dawn News
List of newspapers in Pakistan

References

External links

 
English-language newspapers published in Pakistan
Mass media in Karachi
1941 establishments in India
Newspapers established in 1941
Pakistan Movement
Media related to Muhammad Ali Jinnah
Dawn Media Group
Daily newspapers published in Pakistan